Kirkwood station may refer to:

Kirkwood station (Missouri), an Amtrak station in Kirkwood, Missouri, U.S.A.
Kirkwood railway station, a train station in Coatbridge, Scotland
Kirkwood/La Salle Station, a Muni Metro station in San Francisco, California

See also
Kirkwood (disambiguation)